Haworth is a surname. Notable people with the surname include:

Adrian Hardy Haworth (1767–1833), English entomologist, botanist, and carcinologist
Alan Howarth, Baron Howarth of Newport (born 1944), British Labour Party politician and former Member of Parliament
Alan Haworth (born 1960), Canadian retired ice hockey player
Andy Haworth (born 1988), English footballer
Sir Arthur Haworth, 1st Baronet (1865–1944), British businessman and Liberal politician
Barbara Haworth-Attard (born 1953), Canadian children's book author
Bobs Cogill Haworth (1900–1988), South African-born Canadian painter and potter
Bryn Haworth (born ), British musician
Carl Haworth (born 1989), Canadian soccer player
Cheryl Haworth (born 1983), American Olympic weightlifter
Erasmus Haworth (1855–1932), American geologist
George Haworth (1864–1943), English footballer
Gerrard Wendell Haworth (1911–2006), founder of furniture manufacturer Haworth
Gordie Haworth (born 1932), Canadian retired ice hockey player
Ian Haworth (born 1947), British anti-cultist
James Haworth (1896–1976), British Labour politician
Janet Haworth (born ), Conservative Member of the National Assembly for Wales
Jann Haworth (born 1942), American Pop artist
Jill Haworth (born 1945), English actress
John Haworth (1876–1924), English football manager
Julia Haworth (born 1979), English actress
Kent Haworth (1946–2003), Canadian archivist
Lawrence Haworth (born 1926), American-Canadian philosopher
Leland John Haworth (1904–1979), American physicist and head of the Brookhaven National Laboratory, the Atomic Energy Commission and the National Science Foundation
Paul Leland Haworth (1876–1936), American author, educator, explorer and politician
Robert Haworth (disambiguation), various footballers
Simon Haworth (born 1977), Welsh former international footballer
Speedy Haworth (1922–2008), American country music guitarist and singer
Ted Haworth (1917–1993), American Academy Award-winning production designer and art director
Tony Haworth, Welsh bridge player; see Cheating in bridge#Tony Haworth, 1999
Volga Haworth (–1945), English/Irish-American dancer
Walter Haworth (1883–1950) British chemist
William Haworth (1905–1984), Australian politician

English toponymic surnames